Sharof Mukhiddinov (Uzbek Cyrillic: Шароф Мухитдинов; born 14 April 1997) is an Uzbekistani footballer who plays as a midfielder for FC Nasaf.

References

1997 births
Living people
Uzbekistani footballers
Uzbekistan youth international footballers
Association football midfielders
FC Nasaf players
Uzbekistan Super League players
Uzbekistan international footballers